Equilibrium is a German symphonic folk metal band from Bavaria. The band's music combines elements of folk music, pagan metal, melodic black metal and symphonic metal with various other influences. Their riffs reflect traditional Germanic melodies. Their lyrical themes focus on Germanic tales and Germanic mythology. The songs of the band are almost always in German, although most recently they prioritized the English in their songs, mostly with their sixth album Renegades (2019).

History 
The group toured with Commander and Sycronomica in 2005. The following year they signed a contract with the Nuclear Blast record label and on 27 June 2008 they released their second album, Sagas.

In February 2010, Equilibrium had to cancel their appearance at the Winterfire Festival in Germany "due to serious restructuring within the band". It was later revealed that vocalist Helge Stang and drummer Manuel DiCamillo had left the band. The following month the band announced that Robse, vocalist in the German pagan metal band Vrankenvorde, had been chosen as their new vocalist.

In the same year, Israeli drummer Tuval "Hati" Refaeli, who is also the drummer of the brutal death metal band Viscera Trail joined the band. The band, full again, released their third album, Rekreatur, via Nuclear Blast, on 18 June 2010.

On 27 June 2013, the band announced their first EP, titled Waldschrein, which contains a new single along with its acoustic version, a remake of the song "Der Sturm" and an old, previously unreleased song titled "Zwergenhammer", as well as their own cover of the main theme for the game The Elder Scrolls V: Skyrim, composed by Jeremy Soule, titled "Himmelsrand". The EP was released on 16 August 2013.

The song "Waldschrein" is part of the next album of the band, Erdentempel, which was released in June 2014. However, the album contains a completely re-recorded version of the song. Two days after the announcement of the album, founding members and siblings Andreas Völkl and Sandra Van Eldik decided to leave the band for unspecified reasons.

On 20 May 2014, it was announced that Dom R. Crey (guitarist of Wolfchant and frontman of Nothgard) would be joining the band as new guitarist, replacing Andreas Völkl. On 7 June 2014, one day after Erdentempel release, it was announced that Jen Majura would be joining the band as new bassist, replacing Sandra Van Eldik. With her addition to the band, Equilibrium is complete once again. The band promoted the release of their new album with a European tour, supported by Trollfest and Dom's other band Nothgard.

On 2 November 2015, the band announced via Facebook that bass player Jen Majura had left the band.

On 22 August 2016, the band's fifth album Armageddon was released via Nuclear Blast.

On 22 May 2019, the band announced their sixth album Renegades, which was released on 23 August 2019 via Nuclear Blast. This album is the first one featuring new keyboardist Skadi Rosehurst and new bassist and clean vocalist Skar (Skar Productions on YouTube).

On 13 August 2021, Equilibrium released a new single, titled "Revolution", and announced that they are expected to release their seventh studio album in 2022.

On 27 October 2021, the band will release their new single, "XX", to celebrate their 20th anniversary.
On 3 October 2022, citing a loss of "symbiosis", Equilibrium announced the departure of Robse as vocalist, wishing him well for the future

Band members 

 Current members

René "Berthammer" Berthiaume − guitars (2001–present), keyboards (2003–2005, 2006–2019), clean vocals (2014–2019), bass (2015–2016)
Tuval "Hati" Refaeli – drums (2010–present)
Dom R. Crey – guitars, unclean vocals (2014–present)
Skadi Rosehurst – keyboards (2019–present)
Martin Skar Berger – bass, clean vocals (2019–present)

 Former members
Robert "Robse" Dahn – unclean and clean vocals (2010-2022)
Makki Solvalt – bass (2016–2019)
Jen Majura – bass (2014–2015)
Andreas Völkl − guitars (2001–2014)
Sandra Van Eldik − bass (2001–2014)
Helge Stang − unclean and clean vocals (2001–2010)
Manuel DiCamillo − drums (2006–2010)
Markus Perschke − drums (2005–2006)
Basti Kriegl − drums (2005)
Julius Koblitzek − drums (2003–2004)
Henning Stein − drums (2001–2003)
Armin Dörfler − keyboards (2005–2006)
Conny Kaiser − keyboards (2002–2003)
Michael Heidenreich − keyboards (2001–2002)

Timeline

Discography

Studio albums 
Turis Fratyr (2005) – Black Attakk
Sagas (2008) – Nuclear Blast
Rekreatur (2010) – Nuclear Blast
Erdentempel (2014) – Nuclear Blast
Armageddon (2016) – Nuclear Blast
Renegades (2019) – Nuclear Blast

Singles 
"Die Affeninsel" (2010) – Nuclear Blast
"Karawane" (2014) – Nuclear Blast
"Renegades – A Lost Generation" (2019) – Nuclear Blast
"Path of Destiny" (2019) – Nuclear Blast
"One Folk" (2020) – Nuclear Blast
"Revolution" (2021) – Nuclear Blast
"XX" (2021) – Nuclear Blast

EPs 
Waldschrein (2013) – Nuclear Blast

Demos 
Demo 2003 (2003)

Music videos 
"Blut im Auge" (2008)
"Der Ewige Sieg" (2010)
"Wirtshaus Gaudi" (2014)
"Eternal Destination" (2016)
"Rise Again" (2016)
"Renegades – A Lost Generation" (2019)
"Path of Destiny" (2019)
"Final Tear" (2019)
"One Folk" (2020)
"Revolution" (2021)
"XX" (2021)

Lyric videos 
"Prey" (2016)
"Born to Be Epic" (2016)

References

External links 

 
 

German folk metal musical groups
German symphonic metal musical groups
Viking metal musical groups
German black metal musical groups
Symphonic black metal musical groups
Musical groups established in 2003
Musical quintets
Nuclear Blast artists
2001 establishments in Germany